Lore Berger (17 December 1921 – 14 August 1943) was a Swiss writer who committed suicide at the age of 21.

Biography 
Berger was born in Basel into a family of teachers. In 1939 she entered the University of Basel. During World War II served in the army. At that time she was diagnosed with anorexia nervosa. Her first novel, Der barmherzige Hügel, was written in 1943 for a literary competition. Lore Berger committed suicide on 14 August 1943 at the age of 21. Her book was published after her death. In 1981 the book was adapted by a German film director Beat Kuert into a movie Die Zeit ist böse.

Notable works 

 Der barmherzige Huegel : e. Geschichte gegen Thomas
 La tour sur la colline : histoire contre Thomas
 Der barmherzige Hügel Eine Geschichte gegen Thomas Ergänzt um Fragmente aus dem Journal intime der Autorin
 Rupf zieht aus und viele andere Geschichten von kleinen Leuten
 La collina misericordiosa : una storia contro Thomas
 Über die Aufnahme verschieden temperierten Wassers durch Ziegen bei Änderung der Umwelttemperatur
 Der barmherzige Hugel : Roman

Sources 

20th-century Swiss women writers
Suicides by jumping in Switzerland
Writers from Basel-Stadt
University of Basel alumni
1921 births
1943 suicides
1943 deaths
20th-century Swiss military personnel